Avellaneda is a port city in the province of Buenos Aires, Argentina, and the seat of the Avellaneda Partido, whose population was 342,677 as per the . Avellaneda is located within the Greater Buenos Aires metropolitan area, and is connected to neighboring Buenos Aires by several bridges over the Riachuelo River.

Overview
Located on land granted to Adelantado Juan Torres de Vera y Aragón by Captain Juan de Garay in 1620, a port settlement known as Puerto del Riachuelo first emerged here in 1731. Established as Barracas al Sur on April 7, 1852, by Quilmes Justice of the Peace Martín José de la Serna, the town grew to become a major rail center during the late 19th century. It was renamed on January 11, 1904, after former President Nicolás Avellaneda. It was declared a city on October 23, 1895, and its population has been stable since around 1960. 

Avellaneda is one of the foremost wholesale and industrial centers of Argentina.  The city's largest employers are textile mills, meat-packing and grain-processing plants, oil refineries, metallurgical works, extensive docking facilities, and markets for farm and ranch products; some of the most prominent firms whose main facilities are in Avellaneda are food processor Molinos Río de la Plata, beverage maker Cepas Argentinas, bathroom fixtures maker Ferrum, and América 24 cable news. The National University of Avellaneda was established here in 2009.

The Central Produce Market (Mercado Central de Frutos) also operated in Avellaneda. Located on the banks of the Riachuelo, it was developed by Irish Argentine businessman Eduardo Casey and inaugurated in 1889; served by a Buenos Aires Western Railway rail link, the  brick structure was at the time the largest warehouse in the world. The decentralization of warehousing and wholesaling during the 20th century, as well as its nationalization in 1946 as part of the IAPI state export agency, resulted in its decline, however, and the Central Produce Market closed in 1963. It was ultimately demolished in 1966 to make way for the New Pueyrredón Bridge that connects Avellaneda to the Frondizi Expressway in Buenos Aires proper.

Religion
The Diocese of Avellaneda and Lanús was formally established in 1961. Its cathedral, Iglesia Catedral de la Asunción, had been consecrated a century earlier. The construction of numerous high rises around Alsina Square during the 1950s and '60s led to irreparable structural damage to the cathedral, however, and in 1967 it was closed to the public. Demolished in 1971, the Renaissance Revival cathedral was replaced in 1984 by a modern structure.

Sports

Two of the most important Argentine football clubs, Independiente and Racing, are located in Avellaneda. The city became the third in the world (after Milan and Montevideo) to be home to two world championship teams when Independiente won the 1973 Intercontinental Cup.

People

See

Landmarks

See also

Santa Ana, Santa Fe

References
 Municipality of Avellaneda - Official website. 
 
 Avellaneda Website 

 
Populated places in Buenos Aires Province
Populated places established in 1852
Port settlements in Argentina
Populated coastal places in Argentina
1852 establishments in Argentina
Cities in Argentina
Argentina